Plotavets is a rural locality (a selo) and the administrative center of Plotavskoye Rural Settlement, Korochansky District, Belgorod Oblast, Russia. The population was 449 as of 2010. There are 5 streets.

Geography 
Plotavets is located 14 km north of Korocha (the district's administrative centre) by road. Shlyakh is the nearest rural locality.

References 

Rural localities in Korochansky District